David James Bulbring (born 12 September 1989) is a South African professional rugby union player, currently playing with Welsh Pro14 side Scarlets.

Career

Youth and Lions
He was born in Port Elizabeth and represented  at the 2007 Under 18 Craven Week.

He was  captain for the 2011 Vodacom Cup competition and made two further Super Rugby appearances. He was then part of the squad that won the 2011 Currie Cup Premier Division.

Kings
He made seven appearances for them in the 2012 Vodacom Cup competition, as well as one against a South African Students side.

He was named in the  squad for the 2013 Super Rugby season.

Bulls

Return to the Kings

Scarlets
In February 2016, he joined Welsh Pro12 side Scarlets on a long-term deal until the summer of 2019.

Representative rugby
He was a member of the South Africa Under-20 team that played at the 2009 IRB Junior World Championship. He was named in a South African Barbarians (South) team that faced England during the 2012 mid-year rugby test series.

References

Eastern Province Elephants players
Southern Kings players
1989 births
South African people of British descent
Living people
South African rugby union players
Golden Lions players
Lions (United Rugby Championship) players
Blue Bulls players
Rugby union players from Port Elizabeth
South Africa Under-20 international rugby union players
Rugby union locks
Scarlets players
Kubota Spears Funabashi Tokyo Bay players